The 2016 NAB AFL Under 18 Championships was the 21st edition of the AFL Under 18 Championships. A new format saw nine teams compete in the championships with four teams competing in division two; Northern Territory, NSW/ACT, Queensland, and Tasmania, and five teams compete in division one; Australian Alliance, South Australia, Vic Metro, Vic Country, and Western Australia, with Australian Alliance comprising the best players in division two. Vic Metro won the division one title, with South Australian captain, Jack Graham, winning the Larke Medal as the division one best player. NSW/ACT were the champions of division two, with Queensland midfielder, Jack Bowes, winning the Hunter Harrison Medal as the best player in division two.

Fixture

Division 2

Division 1

All-Australian team
The All-Australian team was selected by Kevin Sheehan (AFL national and international talent manager), Brenton Sanderson (AFL Academy head coach), Michael Ablett (AFL talent football manager), Steve Conole (recruiting manager), Merv Keane (recruiting manager), David Walls (recruiting manager), Simon Dalrymple (recruiting manager).

References

Under-18